Otopharynx tetrastigma is a species of cichlid native to Lake Malawi, Lake Malombe and the upper reaches of the Shire River.  This species can reach a length of  TL.  It can also be found in the aquarium trade.

References

tetrastigma
Fish described in 1894
Taxa named by Albert Günther
Taxonomy articles created by Polbot